Volzhin is a rural locality (a khutor) in Vyshnederevensky Selsoviet Rural Settlement, Lgovsky District, Kursk Oblast, Russia. Population:

Geography 
The khutor is located on the Apoka River (a left tributary of the Seym), 33 km from the Russia–Ukraine border, 73 km south-west of Kursk, 15 km south-west of the district center – the town Lgov, 8.5 km from the selsoviet center – Vyshniye Derevenki.

 Climate
Volzhin has a warm-summer humid continental climate (Dfb in the Köppen climate classification).

Transport 
Volzhin is located 12 km from the road of regional importance  (Kursk – Lgov – Rylsk – border with Ukraine), 3.5 km from the road  (Lgov – Sudzha), 3 km from the road of intermunicipal significance  (38K-024 – Levshinka), 5.5 km from the nearest railway halt 378 km (railway line 322 km – Lgov I).

The rural locality is situated 80 km from Kursk Vostochny Airport, 136 km from Belgorod International Airport and 281 km from Voronezh Peter the Great Airport.

References

Notes

Sources

Rural localities in Lgovsky District